Thomas Oliver Dickens (born 10 December 2002) is an English professional footballer who plays for Cheshunt, on loan at St Neots Town as a defender.

Career
On 3 January 2020, after progressing through Cambridge United's academy, Dickens signed his first professional contract with the club. A week later, Dickens was one of four Cambridge players sent out on loan to St Neots Town until the end of the 2019–20 season. After making nine appearances, scoring once, for St Neots, Dickens was loaned back out to the club ahead of the 2020–21 season. In his second spell at the club, Dickens made 13 appearances in all competitions, scoring twice. On 20 July 2021, Dickens joined Chelmsford City on loan until the end of the season, before being recalled by Cambridge in December 2021 after making 18 appearances in all competitions. On 11 January 2022, Dickens made his debut for Cambridge, coming on as a late substitute in a 2–1 EFL Trophy win against Portsmouth. On 28 January 2022, Dickens returned to Chelmsford on loan. At the end of the 2021–22 season, Dickens was released by Cambridge.

References

2002 births
Living people
Sportspeople from Cambridge
Association football defenders
English footballers
Cambridge United F.C. players
St Neots Town F.C. players
Chelmsford City F.C. players